The 1952 season was Wisła Krakóws 44th year as a club. Wisła was under the name of Gwardia Kraków.

Friendlies

Ekstraklasa

Polish Cup

Ekstraklasa Cup

Squad, appearances and goals

|-
|}

Goalscorers

Disciplinary record

External links
1952 Wisła Kraków season at historiawisly.pl
Wisła in 1952 Ekstraklasa

Wisła Kraków seasons
Association football clubs 1952 season
Wisla